Blue Plains Advanced Wastewater Treatment Plant, located at 5000 Overlook Ave SW, Washington, DC 20032, is the largest advanced wastewater treatment plant in the world. The facility is operated by the District of Columbia Water and Sewer Authority (DC Water). The plant opened in 1937 as a primary treatment facility, and advanced treatment capacity was added in the 1970s and 1980s. The effluent that leaves Blue Plains is discharged to the Potomac River and meets some of the most stringent permit limits in the United States.

Current operations

Capacity and service area

The plant has a treatment capacity of 384 million gallons per day (mgd) or 1.45 Gl per day, with a peak capacity (partial treatment during large storms) of over 1 billion gallons per day (3.8 Gl/day). The plant occupies  in the southwest quadrant of Washington, D.C. and discharges to the Potomac River. It serves over 1.6 million customers in Washington, large portions of adjacent Prince George's County and Montgomery County in Maryland, and portions of Fairfax County and Loudoun County in Virginia.

Nutrient pollution control
Historically, wastewater treatment plants have contributed nutrients such as phosphorus and nitrogen to the waterways in which they discharge. These nutrients deplete oxygen and cause algal blooms in rivers and coastal waters, a process that is detrimental to fish and other aquatic life.

Since the mid-1980s, Blue Plains has reduced its phosphorus discharges to the limit of technology, primarily in support of water quality goals of the Potomac River, but also for the restoration of the Chesapeake Bay. The 1987 Chesapeake Bay Agreement was a first step in reducing nitrogen discharge to waterways that are tributaries of the Chesapeake Bay. Under the agreement, the Bay states and the District of Columbia government committed to voluntarily reduce nitrogen loads by 40 percent from their 1985 levels. Blue Plains was the first plant in the region to achieve that goal. Furthermore, in every year since the full-scale implementation of the biological nitrogen removal (BNR) process was completed in 2000, Blue Plains has every year successfully achieved and exceeded that goal of a 40 percent reduction. In Fiscal Year 2009, the BNR process at Blue Plains reduced the nitrogen load by more than 58 percent. Installation of enhanced nutrient control systems was completed in 2014. The enhanced plant achieves nitrogen effluent levels at 4 mg/L.

Operational award
In 2010, DC Water received the "Platinum Peak Performance Award" from the National Association of Clean Water Agencies. This award is presented to member agencies for exceptional compliance for their National Pollutant Discharge Elimination System (NPDES) permit limits.

Sludge treatment
DC Water began operating its thermal hydrolysis system, for improved treatment of sewage sludge, in 2015. This is the largest thermal hydrolysis facility in the world as of 2016. The system generates high quality sludge that is used as soil amendments (200,000 tons/year). A portion of the sludge is processed in an anaerobic digestion system which generates 10 MW of electricity that is used elsewhere at the treatment plant.

History
The original Blue Plains facility opened in 1937 as a primary treatment facility. It discharged under 100 mgd, serving a population of 650,000. Population increases in the 1950s led to the construction of secondary treatment units in 1959, with an expanded discharge capacity of 240 mgd. In the 1970s a major expansion commenced that led to construction of advanced wastewater treatment components, and by 1983 the capacity was 300 mgd.

References

External links

 Blue Plains Advanced Wastewater Treatment Plant at The Living New Deal

Buildings and structures in Washington, D.C.
Potomac River
Sewage treatment plants in the United States
1938 establishments in Washington, D.C.
Southwest (Washington, D.C.)
Public Works Administration in Washington, D.C.